Hypolycaena toshikoae is a butterfly of the family Lycaenidae first described by Hisakazu Hayashi in 1984. Forewing length: 10–13 mm. It is endemic to the islands of Luzon and Mindoro in the Philippines. On Mount Halcon of Mindoro island, the male is not rare but the female is very rare.

References

 Hayashi Hisakazu, 1984: New Synonyms, New Status, New Combinations, New Species and New Subspecies of Butterflies from the Philippines and Indonesia (Lepidoptera: Satyridae, Riodinidae, Lycaenidae). IWASE.2:9-34.
 Treadaway, Colin G., 1955: Checklist of the butterflies of the Philippine Islands. Nachrichten des Entomologischen Vereins Apollo, Suppl. 14: 7–118.
 
 Hayashi, Hisakazu, 2011: A new record of male of Hypolycaena toshikoae from Mindoro Is. in the Philippines (Text in Japanese). YADORIGA. 228:32-33. .
 , 2012: Revised checklist of the butterflies of the Philippine Islands (Lepidoptera: Rhopalocera). Nachrichten des Entomologischen Vereins Apollo, Suppl. 20: 1–64.

Butterflies described in 1984
Hypolycaenini